Thomas John Burdett (29 October 1915 – 2001) was an English footballer who scored 12 goals from 30 appearances in the Football League playing for Hull City and Lincoln City. He was also on the books of Fulham and Bury, without playing in the league. He played as a forward.

References

1915 births
2001 deaths
People from West Hartlepool
Footballers from Hartlepool
English footballers
Association football forwards
Hull City A.F.C. players
Fulham F.C. players
Lincoln City F.C. players
Bury F.C. players
Rochdale A.F.C. wartime guest players
English Football League players
Place of death missing